Dale Cary is a former American politician. He served as the 30th mayor of Lancaster, Pennsylvania from 1938 to 1950.

References

Mayors of Lancaster, Pennsylvania
Living people
Year of birth missing (living people)